Source Lake may refer to:

Source Lake (Kenora District), in the Nelson River drainage basin
Source Lake (Nipissing District), in Algonquin Park